The translation of "law" to other European languages faces several difficulties. In most European languages, as well as some others influenced by European languages, there are two different words that can be translated to English as "law". For the general comparison in this article the Latin terms  and  will be used. Etymologically,  has some relation to right, just or straight.

General
There are in English two more or less synonymous adjectives, both from Latin origin, that correspond etymologically to the Continental distinction: the common word legal and the less common juridical (or even juristic).

 can sometimes be translated as legislation, statute, statutory law or even act, even if the corresponding ,  and  also exist.  is law made by a political authority, such as a parliament or a government. In modern societies, leges are usually written, though this is not a necessary feature.  is often used in the plural, since each act is one .

On the other hand,  is also polysemous, since it can mean either law or right. Continental legal scholars sometimes make a distinction between "subjective " (any legal right) and "objective " (the whole law), but this does not happen in ordinary language. The two senses of  can be easily distinguished in most cases.

When  means law, it usually has some semantic connection to what is right, just or straight. For instance, the German motto  (literally Unity and law and freedom)) has been translated as Unity and justice and freedom, even though there is a different word for justice.  does not have such a connection. Some translators of Kant's and Hegel's works have translated  as objective right (see Steiner, 2002, p. 276), although those works, especially Kant's, are just about law or, at most, about the best law.

Present day continental law schools and faculties claim to study .

Examples 

There are a few European languages other than English where "law" translates into one word, such as Polish .

To clarify the difference one may look at how these phrases translated into Spanish:

In bilingual and multilingual jurisdictions, a careful translation is needed in legal contexts to avoid ambiguity.  Even excellent translation cannot capture all the connotations of the original words, however, and many scholars argue for bilingual judges who can parse both versions of the text.

In Canada since 1891 the "equal authenticity rule" has held that the French and English versions of all federal laws are considered equally authoritative.  Nevertheless, the English and French texts of important may not translate exactly, which leaves open the possibility that justices may understand the same law to mean two different things.  This includes the problem of "law" versus "". For example, Osgoode Hall scholar Robert Leckey argues that in the 2006 Multani case over the banning of kirpans (Sikh ceremonial daggers) by a school board in Quebec, the justices of the Supreme Court of Canada, despite all writing their reasons in French, disagreed over the meaning of the phrase "" in Section 1 of the Charter of Rights and Freedoms, which appears in the English version of the text as "not prescribed by law".  Relying on different cultural and academic backgrounds (Quebec's civil law and francophone administrative culture, versus the English common law and British traditions elsewhere in Canada) they either decided that the action of school board in banning the kirpan was, or was not, "" or "law" (without reference to the word "prescribed").  Lackey asserts that "[i]n administrative law from France, and in administrative law scholarship written in French in Quebec, a regulation is '' and a decision is not ''" whereas in English-language scholarship the difference between "prescribed by law" and not "prescribed by law" has nothing to do with a distinction between general norms and individual decisions.

This difference between English and other European languages is sometimes invoked in the debates between legal positivism, natural law and interpretivism. A similar point is made by Gardner (2004) in order to distinguish between "law" in general and "legal law".

For the sake of examples, this article uses the Latin words.

In German "Law Schools", sometimes the following allegory is told: The word "" is closely related to the word "" (which is "revenge" in English). It brings in the idea of "an eye for an eye" as the first instrument to overcome uncontrolled revenge. From this point of view,  is institutionalized . But this means: If someone says: "I had 'the right' to do this.", he should say: "I did it out of revenge.", as the person is not a "legal" institution.

References

Further reading
Émile Benveniste (1969) Le vocabulaire des institutions indo-européennes, vol. 2, Pouvoir, droit, religion, Paris: Minuit.
Berkowitz, Roger (2005) The Gift of Science: Leibniz and the Modern Legal Tradition, Harvard University Press. An excerpt is available online.
Fletcher, George (2001) "In honour of 'Ius et Lex'. Some thoughts on speaking about law".
Gardner, John (2004), "The legality of law", Ratio Juris, vol. 17, no. 2, June 2004, 168-181.
Hans Kelsen (1960) Pure Theory of Law, second edition.
Hillel Steiner (2002), "Working Rights", in Kramer, Simmonds, Steiner, A debate over rights, Oxford: Oxford University.

Philosophy of law
Language comparison
Legal terminology by language
Jurisprudence of Catholic canon law
Translation studies
Latin legal terminology
Civil law legal systems